William McInnes Williamson (12 February 1922 – 2006) was a Scottish professional footballer who played as an inside forward for Rangers, St Mirren and Stirling Albion.

Career
Williamson played for local junior clubs Kirkintilloch Rob Roy and Petershill before signing for Rangers in 1941. He served with the Royal Navy as a PE instructor during the Second World War, while also playing for Rangers and as a guest for Manchester City. He became a regular in the Rangers first team in the 1945–46 season.

Williamson played and scored in the first Scottish League Cup final, in 1947. He also won two Scottish league championships and two Scottish Cups with Rangers.  Williamson scored a goal in both of those Scottish Cup finals, in 1948 and 1949.

Williamson later played for St Mirren and Stirling Albion, featuring in a notable win for Stirling against Rangers. After retiring as a player, Williamson worked as a PE teacher at Lenzie Academy.

References

External links

1922 births
2006 deaths
Date of death missing
Scottish footballers
Association football inside forwards
Petershill F.C. players
Rangers F.C. players
St Mirren F.C. players
Stirling Albion F.C. players
Scottish Football League players
Sportspeople from East Dunbartonshire
Sportspeople from Lenzie
Kirkintilloch Rob Roy F.C. players
Manchester City F.C. wartime guest players
People educated at Lenzie Academy
Scottish Junior Football Association players
Royal Navy personnel of World War II
Sportspeople from Kirkintilloch